This list of the Cenozoic life of Kansas contains the various prehistoric life-forms whose fossilized remains have been reported from within the US state of Kansas and are between 66 million and 10,000 years of age.

A

 Acris
 †Acris crepitans
 †Adelphailurus
 †Adelphailurus kansensis – type locality for species
  †Aelurodon
 †Aelurodon taxoides
 Agkistrodon
 †Agkistrodon contortix
 †Agriocharis
 †Agriocharis progenes – type locality for species
  †Agriotherium
 †Alforjas
 †Alforjas taylori
 †Alilepus
 †Alilepus hibbardi
 †Allogona
 †Allogona profunda
 †Allophaiomys
 †Allophaiomys pliocaenicus
 †Ambystoma
 †Ambystoma maculatum
 †Ambystoma tigrinum
  †Amebelodon
 †Amebelodon britti
 Amia
 †Amia calva
  †Amphimachairodus
 †Amphimachairodus coloradensis
 Anas
 †Anas crecca
 †Anchiblarinella
 †Anchiblarinella wakeeneyensis – type locality for species
  †Aphelops
 †Aphelops malacorhinus
 †Aphelops mutilus
 Aplodinotus
 †Aplodinotus grunniens – or unidentified comparable form
  †Arctodus
 †Arctodus pristinus – or unidentified comparable form
 †Arctodus simus
 †Astrohippus
 †Astrohippus ansae

B

 Baiomys
 †Baiomys kolbi – type locality for species
 †Baiomys rexroadi – type locality for species
  †Barbourofelis
  Bassariscus
 †Bassariscus casei – type locality for species
 †Bassariscus ogallalae
 †Bensonomys
 †Bensonomys eliasi
 †Bensonomys meadensis – type locality for species
 †Bensonomys stirtoni
 †Berriochloa
 †Berriochloa amphoralis
 †Berriochloa maxima
 †Berriochloa minuta
 †Berriochloa pumila
 †Berriochloa tuberculata
 †Berriochloa variegata
 †Biorbia
 †Biorbia fossilia
 Bison
  †Bison antiquus – type locality for species
 †Bison bison
  †Bison latifrons
 Blarina
 †Blarina brevicauda
 †Blarina carolinensis
  †Borophagus
 †Borophagus diversidens
 †Borophagus hilli
 †Borophagus pugnator
 †Borophagus secundus – type locality for species
 Botaurus
 †Botaurus hibbardi – type locality for species
 †Brachyopsigale
 †Brachyopsigale dubius – type locality for species
 Bufo
  †Bufo cognatus
 †Bufo hemiophrys
 †Bufo hibbardi
 †Bufo marinus
 †Bufo pliocompactilis – type locality for species
 †Bufo valentinensis
 †Bufo woodhousei
 †Buisnictis
 †Buisnictis breviramus – type locality for species
 †Buisnictis schoffi

C

 †Calippus
 †Calippus large informal
 †Calippus martini
 †Calippus regulus
  †Camelops
 Candona
 †Candona lactea – or unidentified comparable form
 †Candona nyensis
 †Candona truncata
 Canis
 †Canis armbrusteri
  †Canis dirus
 †Canis edwardii
 †Canis ferox
 †Canis latrans
 †Canis lepophagus
  †Capromeryx
 †Capromeryx furcifer
 †Carpocyon
 †Carpocyon compressus
 Carychium
 †Carychium exiguum
 Castor
 †Castor canadensis
  †Castoroides
 †Castoroides ohioensis – or unidentified comparable form
 †Catostomus
 †Catostomus commersoni
 Celtis
 †Celtis willistonii
  †Ceratogaulus
 †Ceratogaulus hatcheri
 †Ceratogaulus minor
 †Cervalces
  †Cervalces scotti
 Cervus
 †Cervus elaphus
 Chaetodipus
 †Chaetodipus hispidus
 Chara
 †Chara globularis – or unidentified comparable form
  †Chasmaporthetes
 Chelydra
 †Chelydra serpentina
 Chrysemys
 †Chrysemys picta
 †Chrysemys scripta
 †Cionella
 †Cionella lubrica
 Clethrionomys
 †Clethrionomys gapperi
 Cnemidophorus
 †Cnemidophorus bilobatus
 †Cnemidophorus sexlineatus
 Coluber
 †Coluber constrictor
 †Copemys – type locality for genus
 †Copemys pisinnus
 †Copemys shotwelli – type locality for species
  †Cosoryx
 †Cosoryx furcatus
 Crotalus
 †Crotalus viridis
 †Cryptantha
 †Cryptantha auriculata
 Cryptotis
 †Cryptotis adamsi
 †Cryptotis kansasensis – type locality for species
 †Cryptotis meadensis – type locality for species
 †Cryptotis parva
 Cynomys
 †Cynomys gunnisoni – or unidentified comparable form
 †Cynomys hibbardi – type locality for species
  †Cynomys ludovicianus
 †Cynomys niobrarius
 †Cynomys spenceri
 †Cynomys vetus – type locality for species
 Cyprideis
 †Cyprideis littoralis
 Cyprinotus – tentative report

D

 Deroceras
 †Deroceras aenigma
 Diadophis
 †Diadophis punctatus
  †Dinohippus
 †Dinohippus interpolatus
 †Dinohippus leidyanus
 Dipodomys
 †Dipodomys hibbardi – type locality for species
  †Dipodomys ordii – or unidentified comparable form
 †Dipoides
 †Dipoides rexroadensis – type locality for species
 †Dipoides wilsoni – type locality for species
 Discus
 †Discus cronkhitei
 †Domninoides
 †Domninoides mimicus – type locality for species

E

 Egretta
 Elaphe – type locality for genus
 †Elaphe kansensis – type locality for species
 †Elaphe obsoleta
 †Elaphe vulpina
 Emydoidea
 †Emydoidea twentei
  †Epicyon
 †Epicyon aelurodontoides – type locality for species
 †Epicyon haydeni
 †Epicyon saevus
 Equus
  †Equus conversidens
 †Equus francisci
 †Equus giganteus – or unidentified comparable form
 †Equus niobrarensis
 †Equus scotti
  †Equus simplicidens
 †Eucastor
 †Euconulus
 †Euconulus fulvus
  †Eucyon
 †Eucyon davisi
 Eumeces
 †Eumeces fasciatus
 †Eumeces hixsonorum – type locality for species
 †Eumeces obsoletus
 †Eumeces septentrionalis
 †Eumeces striatulus
 †Eumecoides
 †Eumecoides hibbardi
 †Eumecoides mylocoelus

F

 Felis
 †Felis rexroadensis
 †Ferissia
 †Ferissia fragilis – or unidentified comparable form
 Ferrissia
 †Ferrissia rivularis
  †Fundulus

G

 Gastrocopta
 †Gastrocopta armifera
 †Gastrocopta cristata
 †Gastrocopta tappaniana
 Geochelone
 Geomys
 †Geomys adamsi – type locality for species
  †Geomys bursarius
 †Geomys jacobi – type locality for species
 †Geomys minor
 †Geomys quinni
 †Geomys tobinensis
 Gerrhonotus
 †Gerrhonotus mungerorum – type locality for species
  †Gigantocamelus
 †Gigantocamelus spatulus
 †Gnathabelodon
 †Gnathabelodon thorpei – type locality for species
  †Gomphotherium
  Gopherus
 Graptemys
 †Graptemys geographica
 Grus
 †Grus americana
 †Grus nannodes – type locality for species
 †Guildayomys
 †Guildayomys hibbardi
 Gyraulus
 †Gyraulus parvus

H

 Hawaiia
 †Hawaiia miniscula
 †Hawaiia minuscula
 Helicodiscus
 †Helicodiscus paralellus
 †Helicodiscus parallelus
 Helisoma
 †Helisoma anceps
 †Helisoma lentum
 †Helisoma trivolvis
  †Hemiauchenia
 †Hemiauchenia macrocephala
 †Hesperoscalops
 †Hesperoscalops rexroadi – type locality for species
 †Hesperoscalops sewardensis – type locality for species
 †Hesperotestudo
 †Hesperotestudo orthopygia
 †Hesperotestudo riggsi
 Heterodon
 †Heterodon nasicus
 †Heterodon platyrhinos
 †Heterodon plionasicus
 †Hibbardomys
 †Hibbardomys fayae – type locality for species
 †Hibbardomys marthae
 †Hibbardomys voorhiesi
 †Hipparion
 †Hipparion tehonense – or unidentified comparable form
  †Hippotherium
 Holbrookia
 †Holbrookia maculata
  †Holmesina
 †Holmesina septentrionalis
 Homo
 †Homo sapiens
  †Homotherium
 †Homotherium serum
 Hyla
 †Hyla cinerea – or unidentified comparable form
 †Hyla gratiosa – or unidentified comparable form
 †Hyla squirella – or unidentified comparable form
 †Hyla versicolor
  †Hypohippus
  †Hypolagus
 †Hypolagus regalis – type locality for species
 †Hypolagus ringoldensis
 †Hypolagus vetus
 †Hypolagus voorhiesi
 †Hystricops

I

 Ictalurus
 †Ictalurus lambda
  †Ictalurus melas
 †Ictalurus punctatus
  †Ictiobus
 Ilyocypris
 †Ilyocypris bradyi
 †Ischyrocyon – tentative report

K

 †Kansasimys
 †Kansasimys dubius
 Kinosternon
  †Kinosternon flavescens
 †Kinosternon subrubrum

L

  Lampropeltis
 †Lampropeltis calligaster
 †Lampropeltis doliata
 †Lampropeltis getulus
 †Lampropeltis similis
 Lasiurus
 †Lasiurus cinereus
 †Lasiurus fossilis – type locality for species
 †Lasiurus golliheri – type locality for species
  Lepisosteus
 †Lepisosteus osseus
  †Lepisosteus platostomus – tentative report
 Lepomis
 †Lepomis cyanellus
  †Lepomis humilis – or unidentified comparable form
 †Leptarctus
 †Leptarctus mummorum – type locality for species
 †Leptarctus woodburnei – type locality for species
 †Leptarctus wortmani – type locality for species
  †Leptocyon
 †Leptocyon vafer
 Lepus
 †Lepus californicus – or unidentified comparable form
 †Longirostromeryx
 Lontra
 †Lontra canadensis
 Lymnaea
 †Lymnaea caperota
 †Lymnaea humulus
 †Lymnaea parva
 Lynx

M

  †Machairodus
 †Machairodus catocopis
 Macrochelys
  †Macrochelys temminckii
 †Macrognathomys
 †Mammut
  †Mammut americanum
 †Mammuthus
  †Mammuthus columbi
 Martes
 †Martes foxi – type locality for species
 †Martes stirtoni – type locality for species
 †Martinogale
 †Martinogale alveodens
 †Megalonyx
 †Megalonyx jeffersonii
  †Megalonyx leptostomus
  †Megantereon
 †Megantereon hesperus
  †Megatylopus
 †Megatylopus cochrani
 †Megatylopus gigas
 †Megatylopus matthewi
 †Menetus
 †Menetus exacuous
 Mephitis
 †Mephitis mephitis – tentative report
 †Mephitis rexroadensis – type locality for species
 †Merychyus
 †Merychyus novomexicanus
 Micropterus
 †Micropterus punctulatus – or unidentified comparable form
 Microtus
 †Microtus llanensis
 †Microtus meadensis
 †Microtus ochrogaster
 †Microtus paroperarius – type locality for species
 †Microtus pennsylvanicus
 Mictomys
 †Mictomys borealis
 †Mictomys kansasensis
 †Mictomys meltoni
 †Mictomys vetus
 †Minytrema – tentative report
 †Mionictis
 Musculium
 †Musculium partineium
 †Musculium transversum
 Mustela
 †Mustela meltoni – type locality for species
 †Mustela rexroadensis – type locality for species
 †Mustela richardsonii – or unidentified comparable form
 †Mylagaulus
 †Mylagaulus sesquipedalis – type locality for species
  †Mylohyus
 †Mylohyus fossilis
 Myotis

N

  †Nannippus
 †Nannippus lenticularis
 †Nannippus peninsulatus
  †Nassella
 †Nassella pohlii
 †Nassella reynoldsii
 †Nebraskomys
 †Nebraskomys mcgrewi
 †Nebraskomys rexroadensis
 †Nekrolagus
 †Nekrolagus progressus – type locality for species
 Neofiber
 †Neofiber leonardi – type locality for species
 Neogale
 †Neogale frenata – or unidentified comparable form
 †Neogale vison
  †Neohipparion
 †Neohipparion affine – or unidentified comparable form
 †Neohipparion eurystyle
 †Neohipparion leptode
 †Neohipparion trampasense
 Neotoma
 †Neotoma floridana – or unidentified comparable form
 †Neotoma leucopetrica
 †Neotoma micropus
 †Neotoma quadriplicata – type locality for species
 †Neotoma sawrockensis – type locality for species
 †Neotoma taylori – type locality for species
 Nerodia
 †Nerodia hillmani
 †Nerodia sipedon
 †Nerterogeomys
 †Nerterogeomys smithi
 Nesovitrea
 †Nesovitrea electrina
 Nettion
 †Nettion ogallalae – type locality for species
  †Nimravides
 †Nimravides thinobates
  †Nothrotheriops
 †Nothrotheriops texanus
 Notiosorex
 †Notiosorex crawfordi
 †Notiosorex jacksoni – type locality for species
 †Notolagus
 †Notolagus lepusculus – type locality for species
 †Notropes
  †Notropis – tentative report

O

  Odocoileus
 Ogmodontomys
 †Ogmodontomys poaphagus – type locality for species
 †Ogmodontomys sawrockensis – type locality for species
 †Ogmophis
 †Ogmophis pliocompactus – type locality for species
 Ondatra
 †Ondatra annectens
 †Ondatra idahoensis
 †Ondatra meadensis
 †Ondatra zibethicus
 Onychomys
 †Onychomys gidleyi – type locality for species
 †Onychomys hollisteri – type locality for species
 †Onychomys leucogaster – or unidentified comparable form
 †Onychomys martini
 †Onychomys pedroensis
 Ophisaurus
 †Ophisaurus attenuatus
  Ortalis
 †Ortalis affinis – type locality for species
 Oryzomys
 †Oryzomys palustris

P

 †Paenemarmota
 †Paenemarmota barbouri
 †Paenemarmota sawrockensis
 †Paleoheterodon
 †Panicum
 †Panicum elegans
 Panthera
  †Panthera leo
 †Paracryptotis
 †Paracryptotis rex – type locality for species
  †Paramylodon
 †Paramylodon harlani
 †Paranasua – or unidentified comparable form
 †Parapliosaccomys
 †Parapliosaccomys hibbardi
 †Pediomeryx
 †Pediomeryx hemphillensis
 †Peraceras
 Perca
  †Perca flavescens
  Perognathus
 †Perognathus coquorum – or unidentified comparable form
 †Perognathus dunklei – type locality for species
 †Perognathus gidleyi
 †Perognathus mclaughlini – type locality for species
 †Perognathus pearlettensis – type locality for species
 †Perognathus rexroadensis – type locality for species
  Peromyscus
 †Peromyscus baumgartneri – type locality for species
 †Peromyscus berendsensis
 †Peromyscus cochrani – type locality for species
 †Peromyscus cragini
 †Peromyscus kansasensis – type locality for species
 †Peromyscus progressus – type locality for species
 †Petenyia
 †Petenyia concisa
 Phenacomys
 †Phenacomys intermedius – or unidentified comparable form
 Phrynosoma
  †Phrynosoma cornutum
 Physa
 †Physa anatina
 †Physa arboreus
 †Physa gyrina
 †Physa hawni
 Pisidium
 †Pisidium abditum
 †Pisidium compressum
 †Pisidium noveboracense
 Pituophis
 †Pituophis catenifer
 †Pituophis melanoleucus
 †Planisorex
 †Planisorex dixonensis
 †Planorbula
 †Planorbula campestris
  †Platybelodon
 †Platybelodon loomisi
  †Platygonus
 †Platygonus bicalcaratus
 †Platygonus compressus – or unidentified comparable form
 †Platygonus pollenae
 †Platygonus vetus – or unidentified comparable form
  Plegadis – or unidentified comparable form
 †Pleiolama
 †Pleiolama vera – type locality for species
 †Plesiogulo
 †Plesiogulo marshalli – type locality for species
 †Plioctomys
 †Plioctomys rinkeri
 †Pliogyps – type locality for genus
 †Pliogyps fisheri – type locality for species
  †Pliohippus
 †Pliohippus nobilis – type locality for species
 †Pliohippus pernix
 †Pliolemmus
 †Pliolemmus antiquus – type locality for species
 †Pliophenacomys
 †Pliophenacomys dixonensis – type locality for species
 †Pliophenacomys finneyi
 †Pliophenacomys meadensis
 †Pliophenacomys osborni
 †Pliophenacomys primaevus – type locality for species
 †Pliopicus – type locality for genus
 †Pliopicus brodkorbi – type locality for species
 †Pliotaxidea
 †Pliotaxidea nevadensis
  †Pomoxis
 †Potamocypris
 †Pratifelis
 †Pratifelis martini – type locality for species
 †Pratilepus
 †Pratilepus kansasensis – type locality for species
  †Procamelus
 †Procastoroides
 †Procastoroides sweeti
 Procyon
  †Procyon lotor
 †Procyon rexroadensis – type locality for species
 †Prodipodomys
 †Prodipodomys centralis
 †Prodipodomys griggsorum
 †Prodipodomys kansensis
 †Prodipodomys tiheni
 †Prodipoides
 †Prodipoides phillisi – type locality for species
 †Prolappula
 †Prolappula verrucosa
 †Prolithospermum
 †Prolithospermum johnstonii
 †Prosthennops
 †Prosthennops serus – type locality for species
  †Protohippus
 †Protohippus gidleyi
 †Protohippus supremus
 †Protolabis
 Pseudacris
 †Pseudacris clarki – or unidentified comparable form
 †Pseudacris triseriata
 Pseudemys
 †Pseudemys hibbardi
  †Pseudhipparion
 †Pseudoceras
 †Pseudoceras skinneri
 Puma
 †Puma concolor
 Pupilla
 †Pupilla sinistra
 Pupoides
 †Pupoides marginatus

R

  †Ramoceros
 †Ramoceros osborni
 †Rana
 †Rana areolata – or unidentified comparable form
 †Rana bucella
 †Rana catesbeiana
 †Rana fayeae
 †Rana parvissima
 †Rana pipiens
 †Rana rexroadensis
 †Regina
 †Regina grahami
 Reithrodontomys
 †Reithrodontomys humulis
 †Reithrodontomys megalotis
 †Reithrodontomys montanus – or unidentified comparable form
 †Reithrodontomys moorei
 †Reithrodontomys pratincola – type locality for species
 †Reithrodontomys rexroadensis – type locality for species
 †Reithrodontomys wetmorei – type locality for species
 Rhinocheilus – tentative report
  †Rhinocheilus lecontei
  †Rhynchotherium

S

  †Satherium
 †Satherium piscinarium
 Scalopus
 †Scalopus aquaticus
  Scaphiopus
 †Scaphiopus hardeni
 Sceloporus
 †Sceloporus robustus – type locality for species
 †Sceloporus undulatus
 †Semotilus
 †Semotilus atromaculatus – or unidentified comparable form
 Sigmodon
 †Sigmodon curtisi – or unidentified comparable form
 †Sigmodon minor
 Sistrurus
 †Sistrurus catenatus
  †Smilodon
 †Soergelia
  †Soergelia mayfieldi – or unidentified comparable form
 Sorex
 †Sorex arcticus
 †Sorex cinereus
 †Sorex cudahyensis
 †Sorex kansasensis – type locality for species
 †Sorex lacustris
 †Sorex leahyi – type locality for species
 †Sorex megapalustris
  †Sorex palustris
 †Sorex pratensis
 †Sorex rexroadensis – type locality for species
 †Sorex sandersi – type locality for species
 †Sorex scottensis – type locality for species
 †Sorex taylori – type locality for species
 Spea
  †Spea bombifrons
 †Spea diversus
 Spermophilus
 †Spermophilus boothi
 †Spermophilus cragini – type locality for species
 †Spermophilus franklinii – or unidentified comparable form
 †Spermophilus fricki
 †Spermophilus howelli – type locality for species
 †Spermophilus lorisrusselli – type locality for species
 †Spermophilus meadensis – type locality for species
 †Spermophilus rexroadensis – type locality for species
 †Spermophilus richardsonii
  †Spermophilus tridecemlineatus
  Sphaerium
 †Sphaerium simile
 Spilogale
 †Spilogale putorius
 †Spilogale rexroadi – type locality for species
 Stagnicola
 †Stagnicola caperata
  †Stegomastodon
 †Stegomastodon mirificus
 †Stegomastodon primitivus
 †Stenotrema
 †Stenotrema leai
 Sternotherus
 †Sternotherus odoratus
 Storeria
 †Storeria dekayi – or unidentified comparable form
 Succinea
  †Succinea ovalis
 †Succinia
 †Succinia concordalis
 †Succinia haydeni
 Sylvilagus
  †Sylvilagus floridanus
 †Symmetrodontomys
 †Symmetrodontomys simplicidens – type locality for species
 Synaptomys
 †Synaptomys australis

T

  Tapirus
 †Tapirus veroensis
 Taxidea
 †Taxidea taxus
  †Teleoceras
 †Teleoceras fossiger – type locality for species
 †Teleoceras guymonense
 Terrapene
  †Terrapene carolina
 †Terrapene ilanensis
 †Texasophis
 †Texasophis wilsoni – type locality for species
 †Texoceros
 †Texoceros guymonensis – or unidentified comparable form
 Thamnophis
 †Thamnophis proximus
  †Thamnophis radix
 †Thamnophis sauritus – or unidentified comparable form
 †Thamnophis sirtalis
 Thomomys
 †Thomomys talpoides
 Trachemys
 †Trachemys scripta
 †Tregobatrachus – type locality for genus
 †Tregobatrachus hibbardi – type locality for species
 †Tregophis – type locality for genus
 †Tregophis brevirachis – type locality for species
 †Tregosorex
 †Tregosorex holmani – type locality for species
 †Trigonictis
 †Trigonictis macrodon
 Trionyx
 †Trionyx spinifer
 Tropidoclonion
 †Tropidoclonion lineatum
  Tympanuchus – or unidentified comparable form

U

 †Untermannerix
 †Untermannerix copiosus
 Urocyon
  †Urocyon cinereoargenteus
 †Urocyon progressus
 †Ustatochoerus
 †Ustatochoerus medius

V

 Vallonia
 †Vallonia gracilicosta
 †Vallonia pulchella
 Valvata
 †Valvata tricarinata
 Vertigo
 †Vertigo ovata
 Vulpes
  †Vulpes velox

Z

 Zapus
 †Zapus burti – type locality for species
  †Zapus hudsonius
 †Zapus rinkeri – type locality for species
 †Zapus sandersi – type locality for species
 Zonitoides
 †Zonitoides arboreus
 †Zonitoides nitidus

References
 

Cenozoic
Kansas